Sumar (also Romanized as Sūmār, Soormar, and Sowmār) is a city and capital of Sumar District, in Qasr-e Shirin County, Kermanshah Province, Iran.  At the 2006 census, its population was 20, in 15 families, making it Iran's least populous settlement with city status. The village is populated by Kurds.

Border market
Sumar border market was inaugurated as the ninth border market on the Iranian side of Iran-Iraq border on 5 April 2015.The border market, in which more than 100 billion rials has been invested, was officially inaugurated during a ceremony attended by the governors of Kermanshah and the Iraqi province of Dialeh. It is located in the Sumar-Mandali border region. As its first commercial activity, the 40-hectare border market's primary aim was to export 200 tons of cement to Iraq. Currently, Parviz border market near the city of Qasr-e Shirin is the major export channel through which 52% of the Iranian goods are exported to Iraq.

See also
Soumar (missile), is named after this city.
Kalhor
Naft shahr
Eyvan
Eyvan County
Ghalajeh tunnel
Gilan-e Gharb County

References

Populated places in Qasr-e Shirin County

Cities in Kermanshah Province
Destroyed cities
Kurdish settlements in Kermanshah Province